Vyatka Land was a part of medieval Rus' in the basin of the Vyatka river, approximately corresponding to the modern Kirov Oblast. While Permian people were its original inhabitants, it was gradually settled by Rus' people, whose arrival is traditionally dated to the late 12th century. Vyatka Land, being geographically isolated from the rest of the Rus' lands, sometimes accepted the suzerainty of Rus' principalities and Turco-Mongol states (Tatar khanates), but de facto enjoyed a large degree of independence until it was annexed by the Grand Duchy of Moscow in 1489.

History

Udmurts inhabited the Vyatka land before the arrival of Rus' settlers. According to the Legend of the Vyatka Land, they came from Novgorod in 1174, conquered Kotelnich and Nikulitsyn with the supernatural help of saints Boris and Gleb and founded Khlynov, which became the main settlement of the Vyatka land (often called Vyatka as well). This account was disputed by some historians who consider the Legend to be a much later and unreliable source. The Rus' settlement appears in the archeological record of the 11th–13th centuries and intensifies after the Mongol invasion of Kievan Rus'. The first undisputed mention of Vyatka in Rus' chronicles dates to 1374, when a band of ushkuyniks from Vyatka raided Sarai. According to an Udmurt legend, the Udmurts who lived in the settlement on the site of future Vyatka burned down their sanctuary, and migrated east to the Cheptsa river.

Tatar prince Bektut conquered Vyatka land in the 1390s. Some of the inhabitants were killed and others were captured. Ten years later prince  of Suzdal ruled in Vyatka, possibly as a vassal of the Golden Horde. There was a rivalry between Vyatka and Ustyug, which led to several battles fought in the late 14th and early 15th centuries.

Some time in the first half of the 15th century Vasily I, the Grand Duke of Moscow took Vyatka Land from the Suzdalian line princes and handed it to his brother Yury together with Galich. Yury lived in the latter and sent a deputy to Vyatka. He fortified Khlynov (Vyatka), Kotelnich and Orlov and thereafter they were considered towns (goroda). Vyatka supported Yury and his son Dmitry Shemyaka against Vasily II in the Muscovite Civil War. Jonah, the metropolitan of Kiev and all Rus', accused the people of Vyatka (Vyatchane) of cruelty, destroying churches and selling captives into slavery in 1452. By that time the war had ended in victory for Vasily II and he subsequently organised several campaigns to subdue Vyatka. The first two were unsuccessful – the Muscovite generals were reportedly bribed off – and only the third one launched in 1459 succeeded. The Muscovite army took Kotelnich and Orlov and besieged Vyatka until it surrendered. It accepted the suzerainty of Moscow and was forced to pay tribute.

Vyatka remained semi-independent even after formally accepting the suzerainty of the Grand Duke of Moscow. They fought together with other Muscovite forces against the Kazan Khanate in 1468, however then-khan Ibrahim of Kazan sent his troops to Vyatka and extracted a promise not to help Moscow against Kazan. When Ivan III gathered forces to attack Kazan in the following year Vyatka refused to join the army, citing the promise to Ibrahim. In 1485 only a show of force made Vyatka join another Muscovite campaign against Kazan. Vyatchane raided both Tatar and Rus' lands: in 1471 they looted Sarai and in the 1480s they twice attacked Muscovite lands on the Northern Dvina. Ivan III sent an army to subdue Vyatka in 1489 under the command of Daniil Shchenya. Kotelnich and Orlov were taken without resistance. Khlynov was besieged on August 16. Khlynov notables presented gifts to the Muscovite generals and offered obedience to the Grand Duke. The generals demanded they hand over three atamans. This was debated for two days in the city and ultimately Vyatchane refused the demand. The Muscovite army started siege preparations, which caused Khlynov to surrender. The three atamans were beheaded in Moscow, Vyatka notables were resettled on the southern border of Muscovy and the merchants were resettled in Dmitrov.

The scarcity of information on Vyatka led Nikolay Kostomarov to remark that "there is nothing in Russian history more obscure than the fortunes of Viatka and its region".

Government
Vyatka land was self-governed to a large degree; however, the nature of its government is not known for sure. The local leaders ( / ) were apparently elected and sometimes they are identified with atamans who headed military campaigns and raids.  There are no explicit mentions of veche in Vyatka in the surviving sources, and historians' opinions on its existence differ. Nikolay Kostomarov and some post-Soviet historians believed that it was the highest authority in Vyatka while Soviet historians argued that there is no proof of its existence.

References

Sources
  The year of losing independence (1452) appears to be incorrect as other sources (Kostomarov, Luppov) indicate that Vyatka accepted the suzerainty of Moscow in 1459 and was annexed in 1489.

Further reading
 
 

Subdivisions of Kievan Rus'
Kirov Oblast